Witch Hunt is a 1993 crime novel by Ian Rankin, under the pseudonym "Jack Harvey". It is the first novel he wrote under this name.

Plot summary

A fishing boat sinks in the English Channel in the middle of the night, and the evidence points to murder. Ex-MI5 operative Dominic Elder comes out of retirement to help investigate the explosion of the boat, as it appears that his long-time obsession, a female assassin known as "Witch", may be responsible.  Using the boat to get to England from France, Witch left a subtle trail of clues to announce her arrival and to warn off Elder.

But that is the least of Special Branch's worries, if Elder's well-honed intuition is correct. He has seen her work before and knows her to be a resourceful enemy, who always seems a step ahead of the authorities. With an imminent summit of world leaders to be held in London, Witch's target seems obvious.

Young Michael Barclay's thoroughness leads him onto Witch's trail, with the help of his liaison in the French police, Dominique Herault. Apart from her language help and guidance around Paris, Michael is sexually attracted to her.

The team of detectives and MI5 agents, and the terrorist, play cat-and-mouse with each other in Scotland, England, France, and even briefly visit a former associate of Witch in prison in Germany.

1993 British novels
Scottish thriller novels
Novels by Ian Rankin
Works published under a pseudonym
Headline Publishing Group books